Artem Nikolayevich Chebotarev (born 26 October 1988 in Stepnoye, Saratov Oblast, Russian SFSR) is a Russian amateur boxer who competes in the -75 kg weight division. He won a bronze medal at the 2013 AIBA World Boxing Championships.

Professional boxing record

References

External links
 
 

Living people
Place of birth missing (living people)
1988 births
Russian male boxers
AIBA World Boxing Championships medalists
Olympic boxers of Russia
Boxers at the 2016 Summer Olympics
Middleweight boxers